Ajax is an unincorporated community located in Mingo County, West Virginia, United States. It was previously known as Himler because it was founded as a company town by the Himler Coal Company.

See also 
 Himlerville, Kentucky
 Martin Himler House

References 

Unincorporated communities in West Virginia
Unincorporated communities in Mingo County, West Virginia
Coal towns in West Virginia